is a Japanese singer and songwriter from Miyazaki. She is signed to 5pb. and debuted in 2010 singing songs for the anime television series Angel Beats! as one of two vocalists for the fictional band Girls Dead Monster. In May 2013, she made her major solo debut with the release of her single "Kimi Tsunagu".

Career
Marina had an interest in singing from a young age, and participated in singing contests in Miyazaki Prefecture, Japan. In 2010, Marina made her debut singing songs composed by Jun Maeda for the anime series Angel Beats! as one of two vocalists for the fictional in-story band Girls Dead Monster. Marina was the vocalist for the character Masami Iwasawa, and the second vocalist, LiSA, sang as the character Yui. As Girls Dead Monster, Marina put out two singles in 2010 on Key's record label Key Sounds Label. The first single "Crow Song" was released on April 23, and the second single "Last Song" was released on December 8. Marina made her first appearance at the 2010 Animelo Summer Live on August 28.

Between 2010 and 2012, Marina was featured as a singer on several albums and singles by the artists Deco*27, Sasakure.UK, and Gokigen Sound. In 2012, Marina sang the opening theme song  to the game Liberation Maiden featured on Level-5's Guild01 video game compilation. Marina made her solo debut on May 29, 2013, with the release of her first single  by 5pb. "Kimi Tsunagu" is used as the opening theme song to Lass' 2013 visual novel Shōjo Shin'iki Shōjo Tengoku: The Garden of Fifth Zoa;  from the same single is used as the game's ending theme song. Marina released her second single  on December 4, 2013. Marina's third single "Hug" was released on May 28, 2014; this song is used as the ending theme to the PlayStation Vita video game Hyperdevotion Noire: Goddess Black Heart. Marina's fourth single  was released on August 27, 2014; the song is used as the opening theme to Lass' 2014 visual novel Mayoeru Futari to Sekai no Subete. Her fifth single "Unite" was released on October 29, 2014; the song is used as the ending theme to the PlayStation Vita video game Hyperdimension Neptunia U. In 2015, Marina reunited with Maeda for the anime series Charlotte as the vocalist for the fictional in-story band Zhiend. She sang the opening theme  and the ending theme  from the 2015 video game Project X Zone 2.

Discography

Singles

Other album appearances

Other video album appearances

References

External links
 

1987 births
Japanese women pop singers
Living people
Musicians from Miyazaki Prefecture
21st-century Japanese singers
21st-century Japanese women singers
Utaite